Louise Augusta Marie Julia Haenel de Cronenthall (18 January 1839 – 9 March 1896) was a German composer who lived and worked in France.

Life
Louise Haenel de Cronenthall was born in Naumburg, Germany, the daughter of piano maker Franz Julius Hänel (1804-1871), and moved to Paris to study at the Conservatoire at age 17. She studied with  Alexandre Joseph Désiré Tariot (1803-1872) for music theory, Camille-Marie Stamaty (1811–1870) for piano, Auguste-Joseph Franchomme (1808–1884) for cello, and Jules Demersseman (1833–1866) for flute and composition. In 1862 she married Léonce du Trousset, marquis d'Héricourt de Valincourt (1822-1889).

Haenel received a medal for her work in the Paris World Fair of 1867. She died in Paris.

Works
Louise Haenel de Cronenthall was a very productive composer. Selected compositions include:

La nuit d'épreuve (The Eight samples) opera, 1867
La Chanson du Thé
Cremonese, string quartet
La cinquantaine villageoise (The Golden Peasant Wedding), symphony
Salute au printemps (spring greeting), symphony
La fantastique (The Great), symphony
Appolonia, symphony
Bonheur pastoral (pastoral happiness), symphony

References

1839 births
1896 deaths
19th-century classical composers
Women classical composers
Austrian classical composers
19th-century women composers